Ichneutica atristriga is a moth of the family Noctuidae. It is endemic to New Zealand and is found through out the North, South and Stewart Islands. The larval hosts likely include tussock grasses included Poa cita, P. colensoi and Festuca novae-zelandiae. Larvae have been reared on species in the genera Bromus and Festuca. The adults of this species are on the wing from November to May. I. atristriga can possibly be confused with the smaller species I. propria. However I. atristriga has thorax and forewings that have a pinkish tinge and I. propria has a dark streak on the discal part of the forewing which I. atristriga lacks. A study has indicated that the population numbers of this species have decreased.

Taxonomy 
This species was described by Francis Walker in 1865 from specimens collected in Nelson and named Xylina atristriga. The male lectotype specimen is held at the Natural History Museum, London. In 1988 J. S. Dugdale, in his catalogue of New Zealand Lepidoptera, placed this species within the Tmetolophota genus. In 2019 Robert Hoare undertook a major review of New Zealand Noctuidae. During this review the genus Ichneutica was greatly expanded and the genus Tmetolophota was subsumed into that genus as a synonym. As a result of this review, this species is now known as Ichneutica atristriga.

Description 
Hoare described the larvae of this species as follows:

Walker described the adults of this species as follows:
The adult male of this species has a wingspan of between 35 and 42 mm and the female has a wingspan of between 35 and 41 mm. I. atristriga can possibly be confused with the smaller species I. propria. However I. atristriga has thorax and forewings that have a pinkish tinge and I. propria has a dark streak on the discal part of the forewing which I. atristriga lacks.

Distribution 
It is endemic to New Zealand. I. atristriga is found through out the North, South and Stewart Islands.

Behaviour 
The adults of this species are on the wing from November to May.

Life history and host species 

The life history of this species is in need of more detailed documentation. The larval hosts likely include tussock grasses included Poa cita, P. colensoi and Festuca novae-zelandiae. Larvae have been reared on species in the genera Bromus and Festuca.

Conservation status 
This species is regarded as being one of the most numerous noctuid species. However Graham White recorded a population decrease of over 40% at two locations during the period from the early 1960s until the late 1980s.

References

Moths described in 1865
Moths of New Zealand
Hadeninae
Endemic fauna of New Zealand
Taxa named by Francis Walker (entomologist)
Endemic moths of New Zealand